Vivek Jaisimha (born 18 March 1964) is an Indian former first-class cricketer who represented Hyderabad and Goa. He is the son of former India international cricketer M. L. Jaisimha.

Life and career
Jaisimha was born on 18 March 1964 in Hyderabad. His father M. L. Jaisimha was also a batsman who played 39 Test matches for India.

Jaisimha was a right-handed batsman and occasional right-arm off break bowler. He played for Hyderabad for 12 seasons from 1982/83 to 1993/94 and Goa for four seasons from 1994/95 to 1997/98. He was part of the Hyderabad team that won the 1986–87 Ranji Trophy and 1987–88 Irani Cup. Jaisimha was one of the top five run-getters of the 1989–90 Ranji Trophy with 534 runs at an average of over 59. He finished his career with close to 4000 runs in 78 first-class matches and more than 500 runs in 19 List A matches.

Jaisimha became a coach after retirement. He worked as the assistant coach of Hyderabad in the early- and mid-2000s. Between 2008 and 2010, he worked as a match referee. He was the batting coach of Hyderabad until November 2010, when he resigned from the position in the aftermath of Hyderabad getting bowled out for 21, the lowest ever Ranji total, in a match against Rajasthan. He then worked as one of the coaches at the Hyderabad Cricket Association's Cricket Academy of Excellence.

References

External links 
 

1964 births
Living people
Indian cricketers
Hyderabad cricketers
Goa cricketers
South Zone cricketers
Indian cricket coaches
Cricketers from Hyderabad, India